Voldemārs Mežgailis (also Voldemar Mezgailis or Mezhgailis; born 22 April 1912, Viļķene parish, Russian Empire – died 1 June 1998 in Riga) was a Latvian chess master.

In 1934, he took 8th Latvian Chess Championship in Riga (Fricis Apšenieks and Vladimirs Petrovs won). He twice represented Latvia in Chess Olympiads: in the 3rd unofficial Olympiad at Munich 1936 (at sixth board, +4 –5 =1), and in the 7th Olympiad at Stockholm 1937 (at third board, +2 –6 =7).

At the end of World War II he won the Latvian Chess Championship in June 1944, and won it again in 1950.

References 

1912 births
1998 deaths
Latvian chess players
Chess Olympiad competitors
People from Limbaži Municipality
Soviet chess players